Presentacion, officially the Municipality of Presentacion, is a 4th class municipality in the province of Camarines Sur, Philippines. According to the 2020 census, it has a population of 22,591 people.

It is formerly known as Parubcan.

History
Municipality was created in 1963.

Geography

Barangays
Presentacion is politically subdivided into 18 barangays.

Climate

Demographics

Economy

Notable personalities

 Imelda Papin, OPM singer

Gallery

See also
List of renamed cities and municipalities of the Philippines

References

External links

 [ Philippine Standard Geographic Code]
Philippine Census Information
Official Site of the Province of Camarines Sur

Municipalities of Camarines Sur